Louis Carey Camilleri (born 13 January 1955) is the former CEO of Ferrari and chairman of Philip Morris International. He resigned from both positions with immediate effect on 10 December 2020, citing personal reasons.

Early life and education
Camilleri was born in Egypt, to Maltese parents.

He received a degree in economics and business administration from HEC Lausanne, the Faculty of Business & Economics of the University of Lausanne (Switzerland).

Philip Morris International
After working as a business analyst with W. R. Grace and Company, in Lausanne, Camilleri joined Philip Morris Europe in 1978 as a business development analyst. He held various positions of increasing authority involving the cigarette business in Europe and the Middle East. In December 1995, he was appointed president and chief executive officer of Kraft Foods. In November 1996, he was named senior vice president and chief financial officer of Philip Morris.

In April 2002, Camilleri became CEO of Philip Morris, now Altria Group. In early 2007, Camilleri became CEO of Philip Morris International when the tobacco company spun off from Altria Group.

Ferrari 
In July 2018, Camilleri was named CEO of Ferrari, replacing Sergio Marchionne. Since starting work with Ferrari, the brand's Formula One team adopted the Mission Winnow monicker.

Compensation
In 2008, Camilleri earned a total compensation of $32,028,923, which included a salary of $1,567,308, stock awards of $14,151,629, and non-equity incentive plan compensation of $9,450,000. His total compensation increased by 33.2% compared to the year before.

Personal life 
Divorced since 2004, Camilleri is the father of three. He speaks fluent English, French, Italian, Arabic and Maltese as well as some German.

References

External links
Resume: Louis C. Camilleri at BusinessWeek online
CEO Compensation at Forbes.

1955 births
Altria Group
American chief executives
Living people
University of Lausanne alumni
Egyptian emigrants to the United States
American people of Maltese descent
Ferrari people
Formula One people
Egyptian expatriates in Switzerland
Automotive businesspeople